, is a Japanese rock band formed in 2005 by Yumi Nakashima, known from the band GO!GO!7188.

The band name comes from one sentence of the classical Japanese alphabet “Iroha”, pronounced Chi-ri-nu-ru-wo-wa-ka.

History

2005: Beginning 
Initially, Nakashima was going to produce her second solo album.
Through the recording of her previous work which is her first solo album Ten no Mikaku, she recognized that she cannot express herself other than the band-style. So she intended to produce the next solo album with a band.
Nakashima wanted to form a serious band which incorporated young power and the band was to be formed.
She first invited bassist Iwai, whom she was always interested in although knowing him only by a recorded performance, to GO!GO!7188’s tour, and she met him for the first time.
She formally asked him to join the band.
Then Nakashima chose drummer Abe who participated in the recording of her solo album after some sessions with several drummers.
Finally Nakashima auditioned guitarists, and Miyashita who was 20 years old passed it.

On September 28, 2005, they released the first album "Iroha" from Toshiba EMI.

On May 15, 2006, they released the first single "Shingetsu" from BM tunes.

2007-2009: Hiatus
Miyashita left the band during hiatus.

2010-Present: Restart

In September, 2010, Chirinuruwowaka resumed activity with new guitarist Natsuki Sakamoto.

In early 2016 it was announced that guitarist Natsuki Sakamoto had left the band. The band has decided to carry on as a three piece and will be releasing a new album in May.

Members

Current members
 , guitar and vocals. She is a member of GO!GO!7188.
 , bass guitar. He is a session bassist and a music producer. He worked with various musicians such as Shiina Ringo, Hiroshi Takano, Suneohair, Acidman, Yui.
 , drums. He is a member of The Collectors, a member of Love Jets, and a member of Texa Staxis.

Former members
 , guitar. He is a member of Mimitto.
 , guitar.

Discography

Albums
Iroha (イロハ), 2005.09.28
Shiro Ana (白穴), 2011.04.20
Akayoroshi (あ可よろし), 2012.04.27
 Unplugged ～ Official pirate version～(あんぷらぐど～オフィシャル海賊版～), 2013
Anarogu (アナログ), 2013.04.20
It, 2014.04.25
Awo Awo, 2015.04.22
Show Time, 2016.05.13
Kimi no Mirai ni You ga Aru (きみの未来に用がある), 2017.05.10
Non-fiction (ノンフィクション), 2018.05.10
MINUS ONE, 2018.12.01
Taiyou no Inu Ma ni (太陽の居ぬ間に), 2019.05.10

Singles
Shingetsu
White Hall

Notes

References

External links
 Chirinuruwowaka (チリヌルヲワカ) - Official Site

Japanese rock music groups